Spiralisigna gloriae is a moth in the family Geometridae. It is found in Hong Kong.

The length of the forewings is about 9 mm. The ground colour is buff-yellow with brown markings.

Etymology
The species is named in honour of Gloria Barretto in recognition of the work done by her on the wildlife in Hong Kong.

References

Moths described in 1999
Eupitheciini